Tazian-e Bala (also Romanized as Tāzīān-e Bālā and Tāzeyan-e Bālā) is a village in Tazian Rural District, in the Central District of Bandar Abbas County, Hormozgan Province, Iran. At the 2006 census, its population was 1,414, in 302 families.

References 

Populated places in Bandar Abbas County